The Soho Center is a 50-year-old 501(c)(3) organization with a special focus on early literacy, enhancing child care, and health. Of special interest is the Soho Center's  National Children's Literacy Website with numerous literacy tips and related information.

The Soho Center also developed and maintains the Virginia Health Information Project (www.vahealth.info) with funding and support from two VA Attorneys General.

The W.K. Kellogg Foundation selected the Center to receive three grants totaling over 1 million dollars.  Work completed under these grants includes the creation and distribution of the National Child Care Resource Directory (now in its 5th Edition) and the writing and production of the Business of Family Child Care DVD.

Recent projects include giving away 30,000 quality hardcover children's books to 1,000 Head Start classrooms in Virginia.  Soho also has launched a book giveaway program aimed at children with cancer, diabetes, mental disabilities, and other serious diseases with the donation of over 10,000 books to UVa Children's Hospital.  Media coverage of UVa Hospital Book Project includes CBS19.

The Soho Center was founded by Jeanna Beker, who remains its executive director. In addition to founding and directing the Soho Center, Jeanna Beker developed various child-related projects both as a consultant and as director of the Soho Center.  Among such projects, she was retained by the United Nations to establish the United Nations Child Care Centre (UNCCC) to serve the organization's multi-national workforce.  This included UNCCC's physical design, policy development, staffing requirements, and educational materials. Current projects include the establishment of FirstClassParents which provides parenting consulting and the design and implementation of the Virginia Health Information Project with funding and support of two Virginia Attorneys General.  The Soho Center was established as a non-profit, tax-exempt 501(c)(3) organization in New York City in 1972; it is currently located in Madison, VA.  The Soho Center is currently completing its expanded classroom space and conference facility.

The Soho Center was selected as one of the "Children and Families Nonprofits" Top 125 for 2011 by Great Nonprofits.  The Soho Center was featured for its innovative use of state tax credits in the "Chronicle of Philanthropy".

References

External links
 
 National Children's Literacy Website
 Virginia Health Information Project
 CBS19 coverage of Soho's 10,000 book giveaway to UVa Children's Hospital

501(c)(3) organizations
Educational organizations based in the United States
Non-profit organizations based in Madison, Virginia
Madison County, Virginia
Organizations established in 1972